Bake Off Uruguay: El gran pastelero (English: Bake Off Uruguay: The Great Baker) is a Uruguayan reality television broadcast on Channel 4 and produced by Metrópolis Films based on the British television baking competition The Great British Bake Off. Premiered on August 26, 2021, the show follows a group of amateur bakers to compete against each other in a series of rounds, attempting to impress a group of judges with their baking skills.

Production 
The Uruguayan version of the talent show was announced in May 2021, while the host and judges, in June. Online registrations were made between the months of May and June of the same year, and the face-to-face auditions were attended by about 2,000 people, of which only 14 were chosen for the first season of the contest. The program is filmed in a large tent, located in Jacksonville, Montevideo.

In early February 2022 it was reported that Jean Paul Bondoux would not return for the second season, he stated that "he was fired". On the 16th, chef and presenter Hugo Soca was announced as his replacement. On the 17th, Facello announced that she would not host the second season in order to "dedicate herself" to other projects. A day later, the production of the program announced that Jimena Sabaris would replace her.

On February 24, Stephanie Rauhut announced that she would also not be returning as a judge in order to "spend time with her family"; she was replaced by chef and author Rose Galfione.

Cast

First season (2021)

Contestants

References

External links 

 
 

2021 Uruguayan television series debuts
Uruguayan reality television series
International versions of The Great British Bake Off
Canal 4 (Uruguayan TV channel) original programming